Ofnidan, or the Greater Tel Aviv Cycle Network, and sometimes transliterated from Hebrew as Ofneidan, is a infrastructure project under construction to establish a network of long-distance bike paths in the Gush Dan, Israel's largest conurbation and metropolitan area. The network will to connect residential areas and employment centers and reduce the use of motorised private transport and the resulting congestion and pollution. The project was first announced in 2015 and the plan originally included more than 145km of segregated bike paths.

Routes
The network consists of seven routes.

Specifications

The planned bike paths will be at least three meters wide, with bridges facilitating rapid and safe crossing of high-speed roads, where necessary. There will also be resting places, water fountains, maps, and appropriate signage.

Controversy
In March 2021, Ynet reported that just six months after an opening ceremony by the Minister for Transport, a section of the bikeway between the Moshe Dayan and Komemiyot highway interchanges was ripped up and closed to commuters with fences. The Ministry of Transportation claimed a detour was paved, but a visit to the site showed no such detour nor any signage indicating a detour, according to the report.

External links

References

Cycling in Israel
Transport in Tel Aviv
Tel Aviv District
Sharon plain
Bat Yam
Petah Tikva
Bnei Brak
Ramat Gan
Herzliya
Ramat HaSharon
Rishon LeZion
Holon